Festuca extremiorientalis is a species of grass in the family Poaceae. This species is native to Altay, Amur, Buryatiya, China North-Central, China South-Central, Chita, Inner Mongolia, Irkutsk, Japan, Khabarovsk, Korea, Krasnoyarsk, Kuril Is., Manchuria, Primorye, Qinghai, Sakhalin, and Tuva. Is perennial and prefers temperate biomes. This species was first described in 1931.

References

extremiorientalis